Mike or Michael McGlinchey may refer to:

 Michael McGlinchey (born 1987), New Zealand footballer
 Michael McGlinchey (actor), in 1979 Australian TV miniseries Top Mates
 Mike McGlinchey (American football coach) (1944–1997), American college football coach
 Mike McGlinchey (offensive lineman) (born 1995), American football offensive tackle